A vapor is a substance in the gas phase below its critical temperature.

Vapor, vapors, vapour or vapours may also refer to:

Art, entertainment, and media

Film
 Vapor (film), a Canadian comedy-drama short film
 Vapors (film), a 1965 short film

Music
 "Vapor" (song), a 2015 song by 5 Seconds of Summer
 Vapours (album), a 2009 album by Islands
 The Vapors, an English new-wave/power pop band
 "Vapours", single by Nathaniel Willemse
 "The Vapours", song on rock concept album The Philosophy of Velocity by Brazil

Other art, entertainment, and media
 Vapor (G.I. Joe), a fictional villain in the G.I. Joe universe, member of Cobra
 Vapor (Marvel Comics), a villainess
 Vapor (novel), by Amanda Filipacchi
 "Vapors" (seaQuest DSV), a second-season episode of seaQuest DSV

Other uses
 VAPOR (software), a visualization tool used in geosciences
 Vapor (web framework), an open-source web framework written in Swift
 Vapour Col, South Shetland Islands, Antarctica
 Vapours (disease), an archaic term for certain mental and/or physical illnesses
 Electronic cigarette vapor

See also
 Vaper, a user of electronic cigarettes
 Vapor Trail (disambiguation)
 Vaporware, a term in the computer industry